The Boy Spies of America was a children's group organized during World War I. It was one of a dozen of extralegal vigilance organizations dedicated to volunteer spying which arose during that war. The group is similar to other organizations, such as the Sedition Slammers, the Terrible Threateners, the American Protective League, and the Knights of Liberty.

Initially the group were created to punish Americans who spoke out against the war. Members reinforced a climate of anti-German sentiment and stopped young men on the street, demanding to see their draft cards. After some time, members targeted any person who spoke negatively about any part of American life. 

Throughout its existence, the group failed to identify any German spies.

See also
American Protective League
American Defense Society
National Security League

References

Anti-German sentiment in the United States
Political advocacy groups in the United States
United States home front during World War I
American vigilantes
Youth organizations based in the United States